Zinger may refer to:

Food
Zingers, an American snack cake made by both Dolly Madison and Hostess

A descriptor added to names of some tart varieties of teas made by Celestial Seasonings

People
Paul Azinger, American professional golfer also known by the nickname Zinger
Zinger (born 1990), stage name of Jung Hana, a South Korean rapper in girl group Secret
Abraham Zinger (1864–1920), Imperial Russian writer
Keith Zinger (born 1985), American football tight end
Dwayne Zinger (born 1976), Canadian ice hockey player
Pablo Zinger (born 1956), conductor, pianist, writer, composer, arranger, lecturer and narrator
Vasily Jakovlevich Zinger (1836–1907), prominent Russian mathematician, botanist and philosopher
Viktor Zinger (born 1941), retired ice hockey player
Yisrael Zinger (born 1948), Israel politician

Other
Zinger, flying enemies present in the Donkey Kong series of video games
Zinger, Iran, a village in Razavi Khorasan Province, Iran
Weekly cabaret listing in Londonist
Mitsubishi Zinger, a crossover SUV sold in Taiwan and some Asian countries
Image artefacts in reconstructed X-ray crystallography data, due to high energy particles impacting fiber optics associated with imaging CCD detectors.
The Zinger, a 1975 rock musical by Harry Chapin
Zinger, a portable powered mobility chair